Michael J. Flaherty (July 7, 1862 – August 10, 1921) was an American businessman, farmer, and politician.

Born in the town of Morrison, Brown County, Wisconsin, Flaherty was a farmer and livestock dealer. He was also involved with the banking, dairy, grain and paper businesses. Flaherty served as treasurer for the town of Morrison. He also served on the school board and served as the board treasurer. In 1899 and 1901, Flaherty served in the Wisconsin State Assembly and was a Democrat. Flaherty died at his home in Morrisn, Wisconsin.

Notes

1862 births
1921 deaths
People from Morrison, Wisconsin
Businesspeople from Wisconsin
Farmers from Wisconsin
School board members in Wisconsin
Democratic Party members of the Wisconsin State Assembly